It Happens All the Time is the debut studio album by American singer Megan Hilty. It was released on March 12, 2013 by Sony Music Entertainment. It debuted at #96 on the Billboard 200 with an estimated 5,000 copies sold in its first week.

Track listing

Chart performance

Release history

References

2013 debut albums